The following proofs of elementary ring properties use only the axioms that define a mathematical ring:

Basics

Multiplication by zero

Theorem:

Unique identity element per binary operation 
Theorem: The identity element e for a binary operation (addition or multiplication) of a ring is unique.

Unique additive inverse element 
Theorem: - a as the additive inverse element for a is unique.

Unique multiplicative inverse element 
Theorem: a−1 as the multiplicative inverse element for a is unique.

Zero ring
Theorem: A ring  is the zero ring (that is, consists of precisely one element) if and only if .

Multiplication by negative one

Theorem:

Multiplication by additive inverse
Theorem: 

Articles containing proofs
Mathematical proofs
Ring theory